Carnett is a surname. Notable people with the surname include:

 Eddie Carnett (1916–2016), American baseball player
 John Berton Carnett (1890–1988), American surgeon
 Carnett's sign, a medical sign

See also
 Carnet (disambiguation)